Ahuja is a surname, mainly in the Punjab region. It is held by Hindus and Sikhs of the Arora Khatri communities. It means "descendant of Ahu".

Notable people

Administration 

 Deepak Ahuja, former CFO at Tesla
 Kiran Ahuja, American attorney serving as the director of the United States Office of Personnel Management
 Sudhir Ahuja, vice president of joint ventures at Alcatel-Lucent
 Sanjiv Ahuja, chairman and CEO of Tillman Global Holdings

Armed Forces 

 Ajay Ahuja, Indian fighter pilot martyred during Kargil War

Art 

 Ameena Ahmad Ahuja, Indian painter, calligrapher, writer and linguist
 Mequitta Ahuja, contemporary painter
 Naman Ahuja, art historian and curator
 Sachin Ahuja, Indian music producer and music composer
 Varun Ahuja, Indian composer, singer-songwriter and a multi-instrumentalist

Athletics 

 Davinder Ahuja, badminton bronze medalist in 1974 Asian Games
 Neha Ahuja, Indian alpine skier and first Indian woman to have qualified for the Winter Olympics
 Suraj Ahuja, former captain of the India national under-19 cricket team

Bollywood 

 Arun Kumar Ahuja, Indian actor
 Govinda Ahuja, Indian actor
 Shiney Ahuja, Indian actor
 Sonam Kapoor Ahuja, Indian actress

Journalism 

 Anjana Ahuja, British Indian science journalist and a former columnist for The Times
 Maneet Ahuja, American author, journalist, television news producer

Politics 

 Gyan Dev Ahuja, BJP politician
 Hargun Das Ahuja, Pakistani politician

Science, medicine and academia 

 Kamal Ahuja, physiologist and the managing and scientific director of JD Healthcare
 M. M. S. Ahuja, Indian physician and endocrinologist
 Narendra Ahuja, Indian-American computer scientist
 Nita Ahuja, surgeon and the Chair of the Department of Surgery at Yale School of Medicine
 Ravindra K. Ahuja, Indian-American computer scientist and entrepreneur and CEO of Optym
 Sunil Kumar Ahuja, professor of medicine, at the University of Texas
 V. K. Ahuja, professor at the Faculty of Law, University of Delhi and is presently serving as the Vice-Chancellor of National Law University, Assam

Social work 

 Jagdish Lal Ahuja, Indian social worker

References

Indian surnames
Punjabi-language surnames
Arora clans
Surnames of Indian origin
Hindu surnames
Khatri clans
Khatri surnames